The Biak black flycatcher or Biak flycatcher (Myiagra atra) is a species of bird in the family Monarchidae.
It is endemic to Biak, Indonesia.

Its natural habitats are subtropical or tropical moist lowland forests and subtropical or tropical mangrove forests.
It is threatened by habitat loss. Alternate names include Biak Myiagra, black flycatcher and black Myiagra flycatcher.

References

Myiagra
Birds of the Schouten Islands
Birds described in 1874
Taxonomy articles created by Polbot
Endemic fauna of the Biak–Numfoor rain forests